Millettia psilopetela is a species of legume in the family Fabaceae.
It is found in Democratic Republic of the Congo and Uganda.

References
 

psilopetela
Flora of the Democratic Republic of the Congo
Flora of Uganda
Least concern plants
Taxonomy articles created by Polbot
Taxobox binomials not recognized by IUCN